Caroline Crawford (born July 19, 1949) is an American rhythm and blues, pop, soul, and disco singer; and actress, who recorded as Carolyn Crawford for Motown Records in the early-mid 1960s, and for other labels later in her career.

Career
In 1963, at the age of about 14, she won a talent contest held by Detroit radio station WCHB, the prize for which was a contract with Motown Records. She recorded three singles for the label, an unsuccessful first release of "Forget About Me" (Motown 1050) being followed by "My Smile Is Just a Frown (Turned Upside Down)" (Motown 1064), written by Smokey Robinson. The record reached # 39 on the Billboard rhythm and blues chart. She also sang backup vocals for some of the Motown artists. Her final record for Motown, "When Someone's Good To You" (Motown 1070), released in December 1964, failed to chart and her contract was not renewed, although the record later became a favorite among British soul fans.

A few years later, she joined a girl group, Hodges, James, Smith and Crawford, put together in 1972 by William "Mickey" Stevenson. She released two singles with them, "Nobody" and "Let's Pick Up The Pieces", before leaving the group (which went on to achieve some success as Hodges, James and Smith). She then joined the group Chapter 8, but left them in 1976 to start a solo career; she was replaced in the group by Anita Baker.

In the late 1970s, and through the early 1980s, she was featured vocalist on several of Hamilton Bohannon's singles and six of his albums, including his biggest US single hit "Let's Start the Dance". She also signed a solo contract with Mercury Records (using the spelling Caroline), and released a single "Coming On Strong" which reached # 66 on the R&B chart at the start of 1979. In addition, she released two albums, My Name Is Caroline (1978) and Nice And Soulful (1979), both produced by Bohannon.

In 1989, (using the spelling Carolyn) she joined Ian Levine's Motorcity project and recorded the album Heartaches, including the single "Timeless" which later became a favourite on the UK Northern soul circuit. She was reported to be still performing (as Caroline Crawford) in Detroit clubs in 2007.

Crawford has also worked as an actress in recent years. She voiced the character of Mrs. Lovat in the 2009 stop-motion film Coraline, and appeared in the TV series Leverage.

Several of her earlier recordings, including recordings for Motown which went unreleased at the time, have been included on later compilation albums.

Her best known recording,"My Smile Is Just a Frown (Turned Upside Down)", is featured in the UK-Irish drama-documentary Dreams of a Life, released in December 2011.

Discography

Singles
 "Forget About Me" (1963)
 "My Smile Is Just a Frown (Turned Upside Down)" (1964) R&B: #39
 "When Someone's Good to You" (1964)
 "I'll Come Running" (1964)
 "My Heart"
 "Devil in His Heart" (written by Robert Gordy, released as Motown 1050 B in October 1963)
 "Too Young, Too Long"
 "Until You Came Along"
 "Keep Stepping (And Don't Look Back)

Albums
 My Name is Caroline (LP) (1978) (Mercury) (as Caroline Crawford)
 Nice and Soulful (LP) (1979) (Mercury) (as Caroline Crawford)
 Heartaches (1990) (as Carolyn Crawford)

References

American rhythm and blues musicians
American women pop singers
Motown artists
Living people
Northern soul musicians
1940s births
21st-century American women